Alfred Joseph Jenkins (born July 15, 1946) is a former professional American football player who played offensive lineman for three seasons for the Cleveland Browns, Miami Dolphins, and Houston Oilers.

The Browns drafted Jenkins in the third round hoping he could bring youth to an aging offensive line which included Paul Brown holdovers Dick Schafrath, Monte Clark and Gene Hickerson. However, injuries limited Jenkins to five games in 1970, allowing Joe Taffoni to win the starting right tackle spot that season following Clark's retirement, while at left tackle, 1971 draftee Doug Dieken eventually replaced Schafrath and held the starting spot through 1984. Hickerson remained in the lineup at guard through 1973, by which time Jenkins was long gone from Cleveland. 

Jenkins was a backup lineman on Miami's undefeated 1972 Super Bowl championship team.  He was one of the players who carried coach Don Shula off the field on their shoulders after the team's victory in Super Bowl VII and as a result his image is included in the bronze statue outside Sun Life Stadium commemorating the event.

During the highlight film of Super Bowl VII produced by NFL Films, Jenkins is shown exclaiming "damn!" after the Washington Redskins scored their lone touchdown on Mike Bass' 49-yard return of Garo Yepremian's infamous pass. When the film shows Redskin quarterback Billy Kilmer throwing a pass into the Washington bench on his team's final possession, Jenkins exclaims "Hey Kilmer! Atta boy Kilmer!".

References

1946 births
Living people
American football offensive guards
American football centers
Cleveland Browns players
Miami Dolphins players
Players of American football from New Orleans
Houston Oilers players
Southern Illinois Salukis football players
Tulsa Golden Hurricane football players